Annette Elizabeth Court (born 24 March 1962) is a British businesswomen, who has been Chairman of Admiral Group since April 2017.

Court studied engineering at the University of Oxford, before joining IBM as a systems engineer in the banking and insurance sectors in 1983. She joined Direct Line in 1994, becoming CEO in 2001. She later became CEO of RBS Insurance when both companies were subsidiaries of Royal Bank of Scotland. In 2007, she joined Zurich as CEO of their European general insurance business, a role she held until 2010.

She has been a board member of Admiral since 2012. She also holds positions as non-executive director of Jardine Lloyd Thomson Group, Workshare and Foxtons, and previously served as a member on the Board of the Association of British Insurers (ABI). She has completed an executive education programme at Harvard Business School. She has two children.

References

External links 
 Bloomberg profile

Living people
1962 births
English chief executives
British corporate directors